Michael Kpakala Francis (born 12 February 1936 – 19 May 2013) was a Liberian prelate of the Catholic Church who led the Apostolic Vicariate of Monrovia from 1976 to 1981 and then served as the first Archbishop of the newly established Archdiocese of Monrovia from 1981 to 2011.

Biography
Michael Kpakala Francis was born on 12 February 1936 in Kakata District, Liberia. He was ordained a priest on 4 August 1963.

On 28 October 1976, Pope John Paul II appointed him titular bishop of Ausuccura and Apostolic Vicar of Monrovia. He received his episcopal consecration on 19 December 1976 from his predecessor, Francis Carroll.

On 19 December 1981, Pope John Paul appointed him the first Archbishop of the newly created Archdiocese of Monrovia.

He suffered a stroke in 2004 that left him paralyzed and unable to speak, using a wheelchair to move. Andrew J. Karnley was named apostolic administrator to help manage the affairs of the Archdiocese. Pope Benedict XVI accepted his resignation on 12 February 2011.

He was the first priest and bishop to institute the Catholic Justice and Peace Council (J.P.C.) in Liberia. This council was organized to defend human rights and civil liberty in the war-ravaged country under then-President Charles Taylor. In 1996, after the famous 6 April fracas in Monrovia, the bishop decided to close all Catholic schools because he felt Catholic institutions (including Radio Veritas) were targeted by fighters loyal to Taylor. The bishop later reconsidered his decision in 1997, after a public outcry.

He died on 19 May 2013 following an illness.

Francis was a recipient of the Robert F. Kennedy Human Rights Award in 1999, given each year to an individual whose courageous activism is at the heart of the human rights movement and in the spirit of Robert F. Kennedy's vision and legacy.

Notes

References

Additional sources

External links
 Michael Kpakala Francis on Catholic Hierarchy.org

1936 births
2013 deaths
Liberian Roman Catholic archbishops
20th-century Roman Catholic archbishops in Africa
21st-century Roman Catholic archbishops in Africa
People from Monrovia
People from Margibi County
Presidents of Inter-territorial Catholic Bishops' Conference of The Gambia and Sierra Leone
Robert F. Kennedy Human Rights Award laureates
Roman Catholic archbishops of Monrovia
Roman Catholic bishops of Monrovia